The Devonian Scherr Formation is a mapped bedrock unit in Pennsylvania, Maryland, Virginia and West Virginia.

Description
The Scherr Formation consists predominantly of siltstone and shale. Lower part of unit includes considerable fine-grained sandstone, while upper two thirds contains almost no sandstone. It weathers light olive gray.

Stratigraphy
Dennison (1970) renamed the old Chemung Formation the Greenland Gap Group and divided it into the lower Scherr Formation and the upper Foreknobs Formation. De Witt (1974) extended the Scherr and Foreknobs into Pennsylvania but did not use the term Greenland Gap Group.

Boswell et al. (1987), does not recognize the Scherr and Foreknobs Formations in the subsurface of West Virginia, and thus, these formations are reduced from "group" to "formation" as the Greenland Gap Formation.

The Minnehaha Springs Member is a "clastic bundle" consisting of interbedded medium gray siltstone and olive-gray shale with some grayish-red siltstone and shale and some sandstone. It is interpreted as turbidites.  This same member is proposed to exist at the base of the Scherr's lateral equivalent, the Lock Haven Formation.

Notable outcrops 
 Type section: along West Virginia Route 42, Grant County

Age 
Relative age dating places the Scherr in the late Devonian.

Paleontology 
The Scherr Formation is the likely origin of the trace fossil Thinopus, which was described in 1896 by Othniel Charles Marsh as the earliest known tetrapod (land vertebrate). Later research, however, identified this fossil as coprolites (fossilized feces) of fishes.

References 

Geologic formations of Maryland
Geologic formations of Pennsylvania
Geologic formations of Virginia
Geologic formations of West Virginia
Shale formations of the United States
Siltstone formations
Devonian System of North America
Devonian Maryland
Devonian geology of Pennsylvania
Devonian geology of Virginia
Devonian West Virginia